Walter Arthur Hudson (18 July 1897 – 9 June 1972) was a New Zealand politician of the Labour Party.

Biography

Early life and career
Hudson  was born in Caversham in 1897. He was educated at the Caversham School and later Caversham Technical College. He then entered the printing trade and became a bookbinder. In 1920 he married Esther Marion Campbell. In 1930 Hudson became an executive member of the Otago branch of the Printing Trades Union and served for four years as president, later becoming vice-president of the national union and later a life member. Hudson was also involved in various local bodies and organisations, such as the Caversham School Committee, Caversham Ratepayers' Association, and Disabled Servicemen's League.

He served in the New Zealand Expeditionary Force for two years in France during World War I. Other than those two years he lived his whole life in Dunedin. His sister Jessie married Labour MP Fred Jones. Wally and his wife helped Jones considerably with his constituency work, especially during World War II when Jones when was engrossed in his role as Minister of Defence.

Political career

He joined the Labour Party in 1928 and served in many positions in the local party. He was president of the  Electorate Committee, secretary of the Caversham branch and vice-president of the Otago Labour Representation Committee.

Hudson was also active in local-body politics. In 1944 he stood on the Labour ticket for the Dunedin City Council, and was the highest polling unsuccessful candidate. He was appointed to the city council in 1945 to fill a vacancy caused by the death of Jim Munro. He lost his seat in 1947 along with all other Labour candidates. At the 1950 local elections he was elected to the Otago Hospital Board. He was to remain a member of the Hospital Board for nine years. For six years he was chairman of the Hospital Board's works committee.

He represented the Mornington electorate in the city of Dunedin from the 1946 election to 1963, when he retired. He was the only representative of the Mornington electorate, as the years of its existence match the years that Hudson was a Member of Parliament. Hudson was actively interested in healthcare matters and was twice New Zealand's representative to international parliamentary conferences on the topic in Kenya and Yugoslavia.

Later life and death
In 1958 he had been appointed to the board of trustees of the Otago Savings' Bank. He was president of the board for two terms; 1962–63 and 1968–69. He was still a board member at the time of his death.

Hudson died in 1972, aged 74, after a short illness.

Notes

References

1897 births
1972 deaths
Bookbinders
New Zealand Labour Party MPs
New Zealand MPs for Dunedin electorates
Members of the New Zealand House of Representatives
20th-century New Zealand politicians
Dunedin City Councillors
New Zealand military personnel of World War I
Members of district health boards in New Zealand